Mardanpur is a village in Hilauli block of Unnao district, Uttar Pradesh, India. As of 2011, its population is 1,668, in 276 households, and it has 2 primary schools and 2 medical practitioners.

The 1961 census recorded Mardanpur as comprising 3 hamlets, with a total population of 668 (353 male and 325 female), in 130 households and 116 physical houses. The area of the village was given as 823 acres.

References

Villages in Unnao district